Prestonia schumanniana is a species of plant in the family Apocynaceae. It is endemic to Ecuador.  Its natural habitat is subtropical or tropical dry forests. It is threatened by habitat loss.

References

Flora of Ecuador
schumanniana
Critically endangered plants
Taxonomy articles created by Polbot